WCTT-FM (107.3 FM, "T-107") is a radio station broadcasting a Top 40/CHR and rock music format. It is licensed to Corbin, Kentucky, United States. The station is currently owned by Encore Communications, Inc.

References

External links

CTT-FM
Contemporary hit radio stations in the United States
1967 establishments in Kentucky
Radio stations established in 1967
Corbin, Kentucky